TheRealDeal was a darknet website and a part of the cyber-arms industry reported to be selling code and zero-day software exploits.

The creators claimed in an interview with DeepDotWeb that the site was founded in direct response to the number of dark websites which have emerged during the past few years which do not actually have anything of value to sell and are just scams. The site relied on Tor and bitcoin similar to other darknet markets but required multi-signature transactions. There was  speculation in the computer security community as to whether the site is a law enforcement sting operation due to apparent listing of exploits at many times below their potential market value.

In July 2015 the website was down for 24 hours at the same time as cyber crime forum Darkode was seized by the FBI and various members arrested in 'Operation Shrouded Horizon'. On 13 August in 2015 the site went offline for unknown reasons. On December 1 it announced its reopening on DeepDotWeb. The Real Deal was shut down in November 2016.

In 2020, cybersecurity author Vinny Troia provided an analysis of the marketplace's MySQL database, which revealed two of the site's three admins to be members of The Dark Overlord hacking group.

See also
 WabiSabiLabi

References

External links

Tor onion services
Defunct darknet markets
Cyberwarfare
Cybercrime